Mansandwal is a village in Batala in Gurdaspur district of Punjab State, India. The village is administrated by Sarpanch an elected representative of the village.

Demography 
, The village has a total number of 426 houses and the population of 2125 of which 1113 are males while 1012 are females.  According to the report published by Census India in 2011, out of the total population of the village 707 people are from Schedule Caste and the village does not have any Schedule Tribe population so far.

See also
List of villages in India

References

External links 
 Tourism of Punjab
 Census of Punjab

Villages in Gurdaspur district